Clanculus providentiae is a species of sea snail, a marine gastropod mollusk in the family Trochidae, the top snails.

References

External links
 To World Register of Marine Species

providentiae
Gastropods described in 1909